Schwabstedt (North Frisian: Swåbstää) is a municipality in the district of Northern Frisia (Nordfriesland), in Schleswig-Holstein, Germany.

History
In 1268 Bishop Bunde of Schleswig sold his castle Gottorp to Eric II, Duke of Schleswig and moved his residence to Schwabstedt.

Education
In 1602, in the year of his investiture, the last Bishop of Schleswig, Prince Ulrik of Denmark (1578–1624, Rühn; titular duke of Holstein and Schleswig, son of Frederick II of Denmark and Sophie of Mecklenburg-Güstrow) founded and endowed the higher school, today's Herzog-Ulrich-Schule.

Sights

The Lutheran St. James' Church was erected around 1160 in Romanesque style from boulders, but later often altered. It is decorated by a carved altar of an unknown artist of about 1520. It stood originally in Husum and Schwabstedt acquired it in 1834 together with paintings of the Twelve Apostles and scenes of the Passion of Jesus. They are pieces of the Tönning-based Dutch painter Govert van Achten, who created them in 1602. Bishop Ulrik donated the carved pulpit, by Hans Pepper from Rendsburg, and the wooden baptismal font in 1606. His many titles and coats-of-arms cover pulpit and font.

References

External links

Nordfriesland